The 2015–16 East Carolina Pirates women's basketball team will represent East Carolina University during the 2015–16 NCAA Division I women's basketball season. The Pirates, led by sixth-year head coach Heather Macy, played their home games at Williams Arena at Minges Coliseum and were second-year members of the American Athletic Conference. They finished the season 13–19, 6–12 AAC play to finish in eighth place. They advanced to the quarterfinals of the American Athletic women's tournament where they lost to Connecticut.

Media
All Pirates home games will have a video stream on Pirates All Access, ESPN3, or AAC Digital. Road games will typically be streamed on the opponent's website, though conference road games could also appear on ESPN3 or AAC Digital. Audio broadcasts for most road games can also be found on the opponent's website.

Roster

Schedule and results

|-
!colspan=9 style="background:#4F0076; color:#FFE600;"| Non-conference regular season

|-
!colspan=9 style="background:#4F0076; color:#FFE600;"| AAC regular season

|-
!colspan=12 style="background:#4B1869;"| American Athletic Conference Women's Tournament

Rankings
2015–16 NCAA Division I women's basketball rankings

See also
 2015–16 East Carolina Pirates men's basketball team

References

East Carolina
East Carolina Pirates women's basketball seasons